The Trump Tapes is a 2022 audiobook release of 20 interviews between journalist Bob Woodward and Donald Trump during his presidency (2016–2020).

Trump sued Woodward and Simon & Schuster in late January 2023, arguing that the published tapes violated his copyright. The author and publisher responded that the lawsuit did not have merit, as the interviews had Trump's consent and were on the record.

References

Bibliography

External links 
 

Audiobooks
English-language books
Simon & Schuster books